Scientific pitch notation (SPN), also known as American standard pitch notation (ASPN) and international pitch notation (IPN), is a method of specifying musical pitch by combining a musical note name (with accidental if needed) and a number identifying the pitch's octave.

Although scientific pitch notation was originally designed as a companion to scientific pitch (see below), the two are not synonymous. Scientific pitch is a pitch standard—a system that defines the specific frequencies of particular pitches (see below). Scientific pitch notation concerns only how pitch names are notated, that is, how they are designated in printed and written text, and does not inherently specify actual frequencies. Thus, the use of scientific pitch notation to distinguish octaves does not depend on the pitch standard used.

Nomenclature
The notation makes use of the traditional tone names (A to G) which are followed by numbers showing which octave they are part of.

For standard A440 pitch equal temperament, the system begins at a frequency of 16.35160 Hz, which is assigned the value C0. 

Octave 0 of SPN marks the low end of what humans can actually perceive, with the average person being able to hear frequencies no lower than 20 Hz as pitches.

The octave number increases by 1 upon an ascension from B to C. Thus, A0 refers to the first A above C0 and middle C (the one-line octave's C or simply )  is denoted as C4 in SPN.  For example, C4 is one note above B3, and A5 is one note above G5.

The octave number is tied to the alphabetic character used to describe the pitch, with the division between note letters ‘B’ and ‘C’, thus:
 "B3" and all of its possible variants (B, B, B, B, B) would properly be designated as being in octave "3".
 "C4" and all of its possible variants (C, C, C, C, C) would properly be designated as being in octave "4".
 In equal temperament "C" is same frequency as "B".

Use
Scientific pitch notation is often used to specify the range of an instrument. It provides an unambiguous means of identifying a note in terms of textual notation rather than frequency, while at the same time avoiding the transposition conventions that are used in writing the music for instruments such as the clarinet and guitar. It is also easily translated into staff notation, as needed. In describing musical pitches, nominally enharmonic spellings can give rise to anomalies where, for example in meantone temperaments C is a lower frequency than B; but such paradoxes usually do not arise in a scientific context.

Scientific pitch notation avoids possible confusion between various derivatives of Helmholtz notation which use similar symbols to refer to different notes. For example, "c" in Helmholtz's original notation refers to the C below middle C, whereas "C" in ABC Notation refers to middle C itself. With scientific pitch notation, middle C is always C, and C is never any note but middle C. This notation system also avoids the "fussiness" of having to visually distinguish between four and five primes, as well as the typographic issues involved in producing acceptable subscripts or substitutes for them. C7 and C8) makes subscripts unnecessary altogether.

Although pitch notation is intended to describe sounds audibly perceptible as pitches, it can also be used to specify the frequency of non-pitch phenomena. Notes below E or higher than E are outside most humans' hearing range, although notes slightly outside the hearing range on the low end may still be indirectly perceptible as pitches due to their overtones falling within the hearing range. For an example of truly inaudible frequencies, when the Chandra X-ray Observatory observed the waves of pressure fronts propagating away from a black hole, their one oscillation every 10 million years was described by NASA as corresponding to the B fifty-seven octaves below middle C (B or 3.235 fHz).

Similar systems
There are pitch-octave notation conventions that appear similar to scientific pitch notation but are based on an alternative octave convention that differs from scientific pitch notation, usually by one octave. For example, middle C ("C4" in ISPN) appears in some MIDI software as "C5" (MIDI note 60). This convention is probably related to a similar convention in sample-based trackers, where C5 is the basic pitch at which a sample plays (8287.12 Hz in MOD), forcing the musician to treat samples at any other pitch as transposing instruments when using them in songs. Alternately, both Yamaha and the software MaxMSP define middle C as C3. Apple's GarageBand also defines middle C (261.6256 Hz) as C3.

Using scientific pitch notation consistently, the MIDI NoteOn message assigns MIDI note 0 to C−1 (five octaves below C4 or Middle C; lowest note on the two largest organs of the world; about one octave below the human hearing threshold: its overtones, however, are audible), MIDI note 21 to A0 (the bottom key of an 88-key piano), MIDI note 60 to C4 (Middle C), MIDI note 69 to A4 (A440), MIDI note 108 to C8 (the top key of an 88-key piano), and MIDI note 127 to G9 (beyond the piano; one octave above the highest note on some keyboard glockenspiels; some notes above the highest-pitched organ pipes).

This creates a linear pitch space in which an octave spans 12 semitones, where each semitone is the distance between adjacent keys of the piano keyboard. Distance in this space corresponds to musical pitch distance in an equal-tempered scale, 2 semitones being a whole step, and 1 semitone being a half step. An equal-tempered semitone can also be subdivided further into 100 cents. Each cent is  semitone or  octave. This measure of pitch allows the expression of microtones not found on standard piano keyboards.

Meantone temperament
The notation is sometimes used in the context of meantone temperament, and does not always assume equal temperament nor the standard concert A4 of 440 Hz; this is particularly the case in connection with earlier music.

The standard proposed to the Acoustical Society of America explicitly states a logarithmic scale for frequency, which excludes meantone temperament, and the base frequency it uses gives A4 a frequency of exactly 440 Hz. However, when dealing with earlier music that did not use equal temperament, it is understandably easier to simply refer to notes by their closest modern equivalent, as opposed to specifying the difference using cents every time.

Table of note frequencies

The table below gives notation for pitches based on standard piano key frequencies: standard concert pitch and twelve-tone equal temperament. When a piano is tuned to just intonation, C4 refers to the same key on the keyboard, but a slightly different frequency. Keys which do not appear on any piano (medium gray) or only on an extended 108-key piano (light gray) are highlighted.

Given the MIDI NoteOn number , the frequency of the note is normally  Hz, using standard tuning.

Scientific pitch versus scientific pitch notation
Scientific pitch (q.v.) is an absolute pitch standard, first proposed in 1713 by French physicist Joseph Sauveur. It was defined so that all Cs are integer powers of 2, with middle C (C4) at 256 hertz. As already noted, it is not dependent upon, nor a part of scientific pitch notation described here. To avoid the confusion in names, scientific pitch is sometimes also called "Verdi tuning" or "philosophical pitch".

The current international pitch standard, using A4 as exactly 440 Hz, had been informally adopted by the music industry as far back as 1926, and A440 became the official international pitch standard in 1955. SPN is routinely used to designate pitch in this system. A4 may be tuned to other frequencies under different tuning standards, and SPN octave designations still apply (ISO 16).

With changes in concert pitch and the widespread adoption of A440 as a musical standard, new scientific frequency tables were published by the Acoustical Society of America in 1939, and adopted by the International Organization for Standardization in 1955. C0, which was exactly 16 Hz under the scientific pitch standard, is now 16.352 Hz under the current international standard system.

See also
Music and mathematics
Helmholtz pitch notation
MIDI
MIDI tuning standard
Piano key frequencies
Keyboard tablature
Letter notation

Footnotes

References

External links
English Octave-Naming Convention – Dolmetsch Music Theory Online
Notefreqs – A complete table of note frequencies and ratios for midi, piano, guitar, bass, and violin. Includes fret measurements (in cm and inches) for building instruments.

Musical notation
Pitch (music)